Malika Arabi (born March 8, 1951, in the wilaya of Tizi Ouzou) is an Algerian writer. She is the author of a trilogy: Shards of Life (2011), Walking in My Father's Footsteps (2013), and Broken Destinies (2015).

Life 
Malika Arabi was born in Kabylie, Mizrana, in the village of Tarsift near Tigzirt. She attended primary school at Tala Mayache school,  and the technical school of Caroubier in Algiers to go to secondary school. In 2013, she appeared at the Boudjima Book Fair.

Works 
 Éclats de vie (2011), 
 Marcher dans les pas de mon père (2013) , 
 Destins brisés (2015). ,

References 

Living people
Algerian writers
1951 births
21st-century Algerian people